Defrenne v Sabena (No 2) (1976) Case 43/75 is a foundational European Union law case, concerning direct effect and the European Social Charter in the European Union. It held that the EU:

The case was championed by the Belgian lawyer Éliane Vogel-Polsky, who was responsible for much of the heavy involvement in sex discrimination law of the time by the European Court of Justice.

Facts 
A woman named Gabrielle Defrenne worked as a flight attendant for the Belgian national airline Sabena. Under Belgian law, female flight attendants were obliged to retire at the age of 40, unlike their male counterparts.  Defrenne had been forced to retire from Sabena in 1968. Defrenne complained that the lower pension rights this entailed violated her right to equal treatment on grounds of gender under article 119 of the Treaty of the European Community, (now Article 157 of the Treaty on the Functioning of the European Union (TFEU) – prior to the Lisbon Treaty, this was article 141 TEC).

Judgment 
The European Court of Justice held that article 119 of the Treaty of the European Community was of such a character as to have horizontal direct effect, and therefore enforceable not merely between individuals and the government, but also between private parties. Article 157 TFEU (119 TEEC, 141 TEC) was invoked which stated "Each Member State shall ensure that the principle of equal pay for male and female workers for equal work or work of equal value is applied"

Significance 
This, further to the case of Van Gend en Loos, identified the horizontal and vertical direct effect of Treaty provisions which could be invoked in national courts and hence they would be bound to protect individual rights.

See also 

 P v S and Cornwall County Council
 United Kingdom labour law
 European labour law

References and sources 
References

Sources

External links 
 Éliane Gubin, Eliane Vogel-Polsky, a woman of conviction, Bruxelles, Institut pour l'Égalité des Femmes et des Hommes, 2007

1976 in case law
1976 in the European Economic Community
European Union labour case law